The Tetbury Avon, also known as the River Avon (Tetbury Branch), Little Avon or Ingleburn (Anglo-Saxon – English river), is a tributary of the Bristol Avon in south-west England. It rises at Tetbury in Gloucestershire and flows in a generally south-easterly direction, joining the Sherston Avon at Malmesbury in Wiltshire.  The water flow has been reduced by public water extraction from its source aquifer in the Cotswold Hills. In the past watermills were used for fulling wool and grinding corn; one working mill survives.

Course
The Tetbury Avon rises at Wor Well to the north east of Tetbury in the Cotswold Hills.  It flows first in a southerly direction, joined on the right bank by the Cutwell Brook at the southeast of the town.  The river now turns in the southeasterly direction into a steep valley through Estcourt Park, where it is joined on the right by the Wormwell Brook, which has its origin at Westonbirt. Passing through Shipton Wood the river forms a lake, created as part of the Estcourt Estate in the late 18th century. It then enters Wiltshire near the village of Brokenborough, flowing to the north of Malmesbury where it joins the Sherston Avon at the eastern edge of the town.

History
As is common amongst Cotswold streams, many watermills were established from early times for fulling wool and grinding corn. Shipton Mill in the wood of the same name still produces organic wheat and rye flours. A mill at this site was recorded in the Domesday Book in 1086.

Natural history
A population of white-clawed crayfish in the Tetbury Avon has been eradicated by fungi hosted by the invasive North American signal crayfish.

Hydrology
It is believed that abstraction of public water supplies from the Great Oolite aquifer of the Cotswolds has reduced flows in the Tetbury Avon, making it difficult to maintain high water quality and having a negative effect on the ecology.

References

External links
Malmesbury River Valleys Trust

Rivers of Gloucestershire
Rivers of Wiltshire
2Tetbury